Boksa may mean

Bokša, a village in Slovakia, now city part of Stropkov
Milan Bokša (born 1951), Czech football manager
Boksa people, an ethnic group of India
Boksa language, a language of India

See also 
 Buksa (disambiguation)
 Boxa